This is a list of airports in Burundi, sorted by location.



Airports

See also 
 Transport in Burundi
 List of airports by ICAO code: H#HB - Burundi
 Wikipedia: WikiProject Aviation/Airline destination lists: Africa#Burundi

References 
 
 
 Great Circle Mapper: Airports in Burundi
 World Aero Data: Burundi

Burundi
 
Airports
Airports
Burundi